Kajetan Sosnowski (1913–1987) was a Polish abstract painter.

External links
Timeline of Life - Kajetan Sosnowski
Extensive Biography

20th-century Polish painters
20th-century Polish male artists
1913 births
1987 deaths
Polish male painters